Anthony Tyson Jackson (born June 6, 1986) is a former American football defensive lineman. He was drafted by the Kansas City Chiefs with the third overall pick in the 2009 NFL Draft. He played college football at LSU.

Early years
Jackson attended West St. John High School in Edgard, Louisiana where he was a member of the Rams 2003 and 2004 2A State Championship teams. He was a two-way lineman who was named Class 2A Defensive Player of the Year after a senior season that totalled 84 tackles, 16 sacks, and 17 pressures, while winning the state championship. He was named All-District and All-Parish on the gridiron and also lettered in basketball. Considered a three-star recruit by Rivals.com, Jackson chose LSU over Oklahoma State and Colorado.

College career
Jackson redshirted for the Tigers in 2004.

As a redshirt freshman in 2005, he earned a spot on the Freshman All-SEC team by the league’s coaches and the Sporting News. He recorded thirteen tackles (8 solos) and two sacks and added five quarterback pressures.

As a sophomore, in 2006, Jackson was a Second-team All-SEC selection. He was a starter at left defensive end and recorded 37 tackles (13 solos). He also had 8.5 sacks, six pressures and 10.5 tackles for a loss. Jackson caused and recovered a fumble, broke up four passes and caught an interception.

As a junior, in 2007, Jackson started thirteen of fourteen games at left defensive end. He totalled 36 tackles (15 solos) with 3.5 sacks, 4.5 stops for losses, and twelve quarterback pressures. Jackson caused a fumble and ranked second in the NCAA among defensive linemen with ten pass break-ups.

As a senior, in 2008, Jackson earned All-SEC Second-team again. He recorded 36 tackles (17 solos) that included 4.5 sacks, 10.5 stops for losses, and seven quarterback pressures. He recovered a fumble and deflected four passes. In total, Jackson started 38 of 53 games at LSU, recording 122 tackles (53 solos) with 18 pass deflections, one interception, two forced fumbles, and a pair of fumble recoveries. He ranks eighth in school history with 18.5 sacks and is eleventh with 27 stops for losses.

Professional career

2009 NFL Draft
Although having played in a 4-3 alignment at Louisiana State, Jackson was considered an ideal 3-4 defensive end.  He drew comparisons to Anthony Weaver.  Jackson was chosen by the Kansas City Chiefs in the first round with the third pick overall.

Kansas City Chiefs

Jackson was drafted with the third overall selection by the Chiefs, who looked to implement him as defensive end into their new 3-4 defense. Jackson remained unsigned at the beginning of the Chiefs' training camp session and did not travel with the team to River Falls, Wisconsin (site of the team's practice facilities). The holdout ended on August 7 as he was signed to a five-year contract reportedly worth $57 million with $31 million guaranteed.
Tyson played in all 16 games of his rookie season and had 38 tackles (27 solo) with two pass deflections. In 2010, he recorded 31 total tackles and one sack. In 2011, Jackson had only one sack though he also had a career record of 55 tackles.

Atlanta Falcons
On March 11, 2014, Jackson signed a five-year $25 million deal with the Atlanta Falcons.

In the 2016 season, Jackson and the Falcons reached Super Bowl LI, where they faced the New England Patriots on February 5, 2017. In the Super Bowl, Jackson had one total tackle as the Falcons fell in a 34–28 overtime defeat.

On March 9, 2017, Jackson was released by the Falcons.

NFL statistics

References

External links
Atlanta Falcons bio
Kansas City Chiefs bio

1986 births
American football defensive ends
Atlanta Falcons players
Kansas City Chiefs players
Living people
LSU Tigers football players
People from Edgard, Louisiana
Players of American football from New Orleans